The Botswana Guardian is an English language weekly newspaper published in Gaborone.The paper was started in 1982. It is published by CBET Ltd. on Thursdays.

See also 
 Azhizhi
 The Voice Botswana
 Mmegi
 The Botswana Gazette
 Yarona FM

References

External links

English-language newspapers published in Africa
Newspapers published in Gaborone
Publications established in 1982
Weekly newspapers
1982 establishments in Botswana